Mae Tha is a district (amphoe) of Lampang province, northern Thailand.

Geography
Neighboring districts are (from the south clockwise): Sop Prap, Ko Kha, Mueang Lampang, Mae Mo of Lampang Province, Long and Wang Chin of Phrae province.

The Phi Pan Nam Mountains dominate the landscape of the district.

Administration

Central administration 
Mae Tha is subdivided into 10 sub-districts (tambons), which are further subdivided into 95 administrative villages (mubans).

The missing number 9 belongs to tambon Sop Pat, which is now part of the District Mae Mo.

Local administration 
There are five sub-district municipalities (thesaban tambons) in the district:
 Pa Tan Na Khrua consisting of sub-district Pa Tan and parts of sub-district Na Khrua.
 Siri Rat consisting of sub-district San Don Kaeo.
 Mae Tha consisting of sub-district Mae Tha.
 Nam Cho consisting of sub-district Nam Cho.
 Na Khrua consisting of parts of sub-district Na Khrua.

There are five sub-district administrative organizations (SAO) in the district:
 Ban Kio consisting of sub-district Ban Kio.
 Ban Bom consisting of sub-district Ban Bom.
 Don Fai consisting of sub-district Don Fai.
 Hua Suea consisting of sub-district Hua Suea.
 Wang Ngoen consisting of sub-district Wang Ngoen.

References

External links
amphoe.com (Thai)

Mae Tha